Georges M. Saad Abi Younes, OLM (born 18 April 1948 in Hammana, Lebanon) is the current eparch of the Maronite Catholic Eparchy of Our Lady of the Martyrs of Lebanon in Mexico.

Life

Georges Abi Younes joined in 1967 to the Lebanese Maronite Order. On January 17, 1970, he professed his perpetual religious vows, and on July 3, 1977 received his ordination to the priesthood, became chaplain of his religious order. Younes studied from 1970 literature, philosophy and theology and graduated in 1977 with a diploma of bachelor's degree. Until 1984 he worked as a secretary at the Faculty of Fine Arts at the Holy Spirit University of Kaslik and at the same time as an active pastor.

In Canada

In 1981 he completed his postgraduate studies at the Université de Montreal and Laval University in Canada. From 1984 to 1988 Younes worked in the Eparchy of Saint Maron of Montreal in Canada and developed extensive pastoral and missionary projects.

In Mexico

In 1988 he took the post of Rector of the Lebanese mission in Mexico. On 26 July 1995 he was appointed Superior of the Lebanese mission in Mexico and on 22 February 1997 his predecessor Bishop Pierre Wadih Tayah named him vicar general for the Maronite Catholic Eparchy of Our Lady of the Martyrs of Lebanon in Mexico. On 22 February 2003, Younes was appointed by Pope John Paul II eparch of the Maronite Catholic Eparchy of Our Lady of the Martyrs of Lebanon. Maronite Patriarch of Antioch, Cardinal Nasrallah Boutros Sfeir ordained him bishop on 26 April 2003 and his co-consecrators were Bishop Roland Aboujaoudé, Auxiliary Bishop of Antioch and Joseph Mohsen Béchara, Archeparch of Antelias.

References

External links
 http://www.catholic-hierarchy.org/bishop/bsaad.html
 http://www.gcatholic.org/dioceses/diocese/nsma0.htm

1948 births
Lebanese Maronites
Living people
21st-century Maronite Catholic bishops